The Gowanus Session is an album by pianist Thollem McDonas, guitarist Nels Cline, and bassist William Parker recorded in 2012 for the Porter label.

Reception

The All About Jazz review by Glenn Astarita awarded the album 4½ stars stating "Glaring expressionism coupled with rip-roaring layers of acoustic-electric sound-sculpting maneuvers yield the bountiful fruit on this manifold studio date". JazzTimes' Steve Greenlea said "pianist Thollem McDonas, bassist William Parker and electric guitarist Nels Cline play seemingly indiscriminately, creating unmusical layers of sound. These are not songs. There are no melodies, no rhythms. The Gowanus Session is a sound sculpture... So is this a good record, or even an enjoyable one? I really don’t know, but I do know this: It’s interesting, and I keep listening to it."

Track listing
All compositions by Nels Cline, Thollem McDonas & William Parker
 "There Are" - 7:32  
 "As Many Worlds" - 4:42  
 "In A Life" - 5:57  
 "As There Are" - 2:15  
 "Lives" - 15:43  
 "In The World." - 4:53

Personnel
Thollem McDonas - piano
Nels Cline - electric guitar 
William Parker - bass

References

Nels Cline albums
William Parker (musician) albums
2012 albums
Porter Records albums